Eysteinn (Swedish: Östen; died ca 600) was the son of Eadgils. He was the father of Ingvar. The Eysteinn tumulus (Östens hög) in Västerås near Östanbro has been linked to King Eysteinn by some popular historians. The term Hög is derived from the Old Norse word haugr meaning mound or barrow. 

Eysteinn ruled Sweden at the time when Hrólf Kraki died in Lejre. It was a troubled time when many sea kings ravaged Swedish shores. One of those kings was named Sölve and he was from Jutland (but according to Historia Norwegiae he was Geatish, see below). At this time Sölve was pillaging in the Baltic Sea. He arrived in Lofond (probably the island of Lovön or the Lagunda Hundred), where Eysteinn was at a feast. Sölve and his men surrounded the house and set it on fire burning everyone inside to death. Then Sölve arrived at Sigtuna (Old Sigtuna) and ordered the Swedes to accept him as king. The Swedes refused and gathered an army that fought against Sölve and his men, but they lost after eleven days. The Swedes had to accept him as king until they rebelled and killed him.

Ynglingatal 
Stanza from Þjóðólfr of Hvinir's Ynglingatal:

The Historia Norwegiæ presents a Latin summary of Ynglingatal, older than Snorri's quotation (continuing after Eadgils, called Adils or Athisl):

Thorsteins saga Víkingssonar makes Eysteinn the father of Anund and grandfather of Ingjald and consequently skips Ingvar's generation. It adds a second son to Eysteinn named Olaf, who was the king of Fjordane in Norway.

See also 
Historia Norwegiae
Thorsteins saga Víkingssonar
Ynglinga saga (part of the Heimskringla)
Ynglingatal

Notes

Sources 
 

600 deaths
6th-century rulers in Europe
People whose existence is disputed
Semi-legendary kings of Sweden
Year of birth unknown